The 2008 Virginia Cavaliers football team represented the University of Virginia during the 2008 NCAA Division I FBS football season. It was Virginia's 55th season as a member of the Atlantic Coast Conference (ACC). The Cavaliers were led by head coach Al Groh. They played their home games at Scott Stadium in Charlottesville, Virginia.

Preseason
The 2008 preseason began in early January, with the loss of starting quarterback Jameel Sewell due to academic ineligibility as well as three other players who were not enrolled for the Spring 2008 semester; junior cornerback Chris Cook, freshman wide receiver Chris Dalton and freshman linebacker Darnell Carter.

In February 2008, defensive back Mike Brown was arrested by UVa police and charged with one count each of grand larceny, possession of stolen property with intent to sell, altering serial numbers, and possession of marijuana.  Al Groh said of the situation, "At this time we are currently gathering the facts. In view of the nature of the allegation, Mike Brown is not participating with the program at this time."  Also in February, defensive end Jeffery Fitzgerald left the school, and subsequently the team, after allegations of honor code violations; the university stating that, "Fitzgerald is no longer enrolled and will never play again for the 'Hoos."

Peter Lalich controversy
On July 24, 2008, Peter Lalich, quarterback, was charged with unlawful purchase and possession of alcohol, a misdemeanor.  Coach Groh would not comment on the charge, and stated that any disciplinary action would be dealt with internally, within the team.  Lalich's case has been continued until July 21, 2009, at which point his charges will be dropped should he avoid further trouble.

On September 5, 2008, it was reported that Lalich had admitted to court officials that he had used marijuana and alcohol while on supervised probation.  The voluntary admission came during a regular probation interview with officials from the office of Offender Aid and Restoration/Virginia Alcohol Safety Program.  He is scheduled for a hearing on September 26.  On September 10, 2008 it was announced through a statement from Virginia's sports information office that Lalich would not be starting in the September 13 game against the University of Connecticut.

On Thursday, September 18, Lalich admitted that he had violated the terms of his probation. Later the same day, he was dismissed from the Cavalier football team. In a statement, UVA Athletic Director Craig Littlepage said, "We have supported Peter, but believe today a point has been reached where it’s best for all concerned that [Peter] no longer participate on the team. This is my decision, and it has support of head football coach Al Groh. We wish Peter the best in the future."

Schedule

Personnel

Coaching staff

Players

Recruiting

-->

Watch list

Game summaries

USC

The No. 3 ranked Trojans scored three touchdowns in the first quarter to beat the Cavaliers to win the first game of the season. USC quarterback Mark Sanchez threw for 338 yards, CJ Gable ran for 73 yards, and Ronald Johnson had 78 yards in receiving. The second half was all USC, with UVA turning over the ball three times.

Richmond

Connecticut

Duke

Maryland

East Carolina

North Carolina

Georgia Tech

Miami

Wake Forest

Clemson

Virginia Tech

Rankings

Statistics

Team

Scores by quarter

Offense

Rushing

Passing

Receiving

Defense

Special teams

References

Virginia
Virginia Cavaliers football seasons
Virginia Cavaliers football